Ökü (also, Okyu) is a village in the Yardymli Rayon of Azerbaijan.  The village forms part of the municipality of Mamulğan.

References

External links 

Populated places in Yardimli District